Silvio Pettirossi International Airport  is an international airport in Luque, Paraguay, which serves Paraguay's capital city, Asunción, and indirectly serves the nearby city of Clorinda, Formosa in Argentina. The airport is named after Paraguayan aviator Silvio Pettirossi. Between 1980 and 1989, it was known as President Stroessner International Airport, after the former head of state, Alfredo Stroessner. Pettirossi handled 1.24 million passengers in 2019, making it the busiest airport in the country. It is the main international hub for LATAM Paraguay and Paranair.

Some of its facilities are shared with the Ñu-Guazú Air Force Base of the Paraguayan Air Force.

History
The airport was inaugurated on 11 June 1938. The airport's runway was constructed in the 1960s, and was resurfaced in 1985.

Spanish airline Iberia provided direct flights to Asunción from Madrid from around 1968 until the mid-1990s. Lufthansa flew once a week from Frankfurt to Asunción from 1971 to 1980, with DC-10 service starting in 1974. For both airlines, the flights included multiple stops in destinations throughout South America. Also, between early 90s and 1996, Lineas Aereas Paraguayas flew nonstop to Frankfurt with its DC-10.

2000s

In November 2004, the director of Direccion Nacional de Aeronautica Civil (DINAC), Eustaquio Ocáriz, told ABC Color that the airport's runway, which had repair work started in 2001, but halted due to lack of funds, would be completed by the early months of 2005.

On 31 July 2007, at 05:10am, a group of five men stole  from a money exchange on the bottom floor of the airport. One of the robbers, Juan Pablo Ortigoza, was detained, along with others. Another robber was captured in Encarnación.  It was later discovered that the robbery was planned in Asunción's Tacumbú prison. One of the arrested stated they received  for the robbery. The money was going to be sent on a flight to Uruguay.

In May 2008, a report concluded that Paraguay's aeronautic systems were in a critical state and needed to be replaced. In November 2009, new instrument landing systems began operating. The previous system that was replaced was installed in 1980. The implementation of the system made Paraguay up to date with the requirements of international security as a member of the OACI.

2010s
In January 2013, various improvements were made to the terminal. By 2015, some airlines ceased operations at the airport, including American Airlines. On 17 December 2015, Air Europa began service between Pettirossi and Madrid, Spain, creating the first direct connection between Paraguay and Europe in 21 years.

In 2017, airport infrastructure specialist Carlos Achucarro estimated that the airport would require expansion before 2024. In January 2018, DINAC reported that the airport has seen a 15 percent raise in travellers from 2013 to 2017. The airport also saw an increase in flights, from 20 daily flights to about 60 flights by 2018.

2020s
Pettirossi Airport ceased operating commercial flights for 7 months due to the COVID-19 pandemic. In October 2020, DINAC announced a ceremony for the resumption of flights.

In November 2020, drugs were found by agents of the National Secretary of Antidrugs. They were disguised as parcels and were to be sent to various countries. In February 2021, plans for a second terminal were unveiled, to be started in 2022. In October 2021, a new route, operated by Paranair, was announced between Pettirossi and Santa Cruz de la Sierra.

Terminals 
The original passenger terminal, located near threshold 02, is now instead used by Grupo Aerotáctico (GAT) of the Paraguayan Air Force. The current terminal began service on 20 March 1980. 

The terminal building is split into two international concourses: the south concourse having gates 1 to 4, and the north concourse having gates 5 and 6. The airport is being expanded to accommodate more gates.

Access
It may be reached via the Aviadores del Chaco Avenue, which runs adjacent to nearby Ñu Guasú Park. Bus line 30-A links Asunción's downtown with the airport terminal.

Airlines and destinations

Passenger

Cargo

Statistics

The following is the number of passengers movements into the airport, according to the Dirección Nacional de Aeronáutica Civil's Aviation Sector Summary Reports.

Top routes in 2018

Accidents and incidents 
16 June 1955: a Panair do Brasil–owned Lockheed L-149 Constellation, with registration PP-PDJ, was operating flight 263 from São Paulo-Congonhas to Asunción. It hit a 12m tree while on its final approach to land at Asunción. Part of the wing broke off, the aircraft crashed and caught fire. Of the 24 passengers and crew aboard, 16 died.
27 August 1959: an Aerolíneas Argentinas–owned de Havilland DH-106 Comet 4, with registration LV-AHP, was operating a flight from Buenos Aires to Asunción. While on approach to Asunción, bad weather caused a forced landing close to the airport. A crew member and a passenger died.
29 August 1980: a Transporte Aéreo Militar–owned Douglas C-47B, with registration FAP2016, crashed on approach to Asunción. The aircraft was on a flight to Ayolas when an engine failed shortly after take-off and the decision was made to land back at Asunción. One person died.
4 February 1996: a cargo LAC Colombia–owned Douglas DC-8-55F, with registration HK-3979X, was on an empty positioning flight around Asunción prior to a flight from Asunción to Campinas. At VR power was reduced on no. 1 engine and, after rotation, also on the no. 2 engine. With the gear still down and flaps at 15° the aircraft lost control and crashed on a playing field 2 km past the runway. The crew possibly used the positioning flight as an opportunity for crew training. All four occupants of the aircraft and 20 persons on the ground died.

Gallery

See also

List of airports in Paraguay
Transport in Paraguay
List of airports by ICAO code: S#SG - Paraguay

References

External links

1938 establishments in Paraguay
Airports established in 1938
Airports in Paraguay
Transport in Asunción
Central Department
Airfields of the United States Army Air Forces Air Transport Command in South America